The women's 100 metres at the 2021 World Athletics U20 Championships was held at the Kasarani Stadium on 18 and 19 August.

Records

Results

Heats
Qualification: First 4 of each heat (Q) and the 4 fastest times (q) qualified for the semifinal.

Wind:Heat 1: +0.5 m/s, Heat 2: +0.5 m/s, Heat 3: +1.0 m/s, Heat 4: -0.1 m/s, Heat 5: -0.9 m/s

Semifinals
Qualification: First 2 of each heat (Q) and the 2 fastest times (q) qualified for the final.

Wind:Heat 1: 0.0 m/s, Heat 2: +0.3 m/s, Heat 3: -0.5 m/s

Final
The final was held on 19 August at 18:10.

Wind: -0.6 m/s

References

100 metres
100 metres at the World Athletics U20 Championships
U20